Waipahu is a former sugarcane plantation town and now census-designated place (CDP) located in the Ewa District on the island of Oahu in the City & County of Honolulu, Hawaii, United States. As of the 2020 census, the CDP population was 43,485. The U.S. postal code for Waipahu is 96797.

History
Waipahu is the name of an artesian spring. In Hawaiian, Waipahu is derived from wai, meaning water, and pahū, meaning "burst or explode"; combined, Waipahu means "water forced up (as out of a spring)". The early Native Hawaiians took pleasure in the cool and clear water gushing from the ground and named this spring Waipahu. Before the Western civilization set foot in Hawaii, the Hawaiians considered Waipahu to be the capital of Oahu. Royalty in the Kingdom of Hawaii would often gather and enjoy the fresh water from the spring Waipahu.

In 1897, Oahu Sugar Company was incorporated, and its board of directors located the sugar mill in Waipahu. It had 943 field workers. There were 44 Hawaiians, including 10 minors; 57 Portuguese; 443 Japanese, 408 of them contract laborers; and 399 Chinese, 374 of whom were contract laborers. The company's managers from 1897 to 1940 were August Ahrens (1897–1904), E.K. Bull (1904–1919), J.B. Thomson (1919–1923), E.W. Greene (1923–1937), and Hans L'Orange (1937–1956).

In the early days of the plantation, each worker was assigned a number inscribed on a metal disc about the size of a silver dollar. The numbers 1 through 899 identified Japanese alien; 900 through 1400 were Japanese who were American citizens or Hawaii-born. The 2000 and 2100 series were Portuguese laborers, 2200 Spanish, 2300 Hawaiian, 2400 Puerto Rican, 3000 Chinese or Korean, 4000 and 5000 Filipino. The company imported laborers from many different countries including the Philippines, Japan, China, Portugal, and Norway. Very few laborers working for the Oahu Sugar Co. were Hawaiian. The majority of the company's first laborers were either Japanese or Chinese. Each ethnic group was broken up into different camps. This division was said to have been the result of different cultures and language barriers.

Plantation workers lived by what was called The Plantation System. Field workers received an average monthly salary of $12.50. However, Filipino immigrants were paid less than all of the other laborers because they were the cheapest to import. The Filipinos, on average, made less than $10.00 a month. The Chinese generally were paid the most with a monthly average of $15.00.

In 1932 the Oahu Sugar Co. opened a continuation school, and allowed a half-day off from work once a week for workers to attend. Those who weren't available during the day could also attend evening courses. This was to give them a chance to better their knowledge for a better job.

During the surprise attack on Pearl Harbor on December 7, 1941, Imperial Japanese Navy (IJN) planes fired at the sugar mill in Waipahu, killing a civilian and injuring seven others.

Amfac acquired the company in 1961. Oahu Sugar Company shut down plantation operations after the 1995 harvest.

In 1923, the Oahu Sugar Company field also served as the community center which featured band concerts, sporting events, and carnivals. Later, the athletic field was renamed Hans L'Orange Field. Today, the park is primarily used for baseball, and is the home field of Hawaii Pacific University's men's baseball team, the Sea Warriors. It was the home field of the Hawaii Winter Baseball teams the North Shore Honu and West Oahu CaneFires until 2008.

In 1973, the City and County of Honolulu and the State of Hawai'i purchased  opposite the Waipahu sugar mill to establish the Waipahu Cultural and Garden Park. The park is known today as the Hawai'i Plantation Village. Hawai'i Plantation Village is a living history museum located in Waipahu.

In 1997, the Governor of Hawaii, Benjamin J. Cayetano, proclaimed the months of June 1997 through November 1997 to be Waipahu Centennial Celebration Months. Many activities and events were held to celebrate the Waipahu Centennial.

Waipahu is the home to the 2008 Little League World Series champions from Waipi'o Little League.  They defeated Matamoros, Mexico 12–3 in the final game on August 24, 2008. On August 28, 2010, that same team won the U.S. championship of the Little League World Series, defeating the team from Pearland, Texas, but lost to Edogawa Minami LL of Tokyo on August 29, 2010, in the international championship.

Geography

Waipahu is located along the northern shore of both Middle Loch and West Loch of Pearl Harbor.  Both Interstate H-1 and Farrington Highway (Hawaii Route 90) run east–west through the length of Waipahu. The town of Waipahu spans across three ahupuaʻa (historic Native Hawaiian land division): Waipiʻo, Waikele, and Hōʻaeʻae. It is common for neighborhoods to be named after the ahupuaʻa in which it's located. The neighboring areas of Waipio, Village Park, Royal Kunia and Waikele use Waipahu as their postal city, and are often considered to be part of Waipahu. 

There are several streams that run through Waipahu, including Waikele Stream and Kapakahi Stream. Waikele Stream runs along the Hawaii Plantation Village and down into Pouhala Marsh Wildlife Sanctuary, which is habitat for several endangered bird species that are endemic to Hawaii. There is roughly 140 feet of elevation change between the north side of Waipahu along H-1 and sea level. 

Waikele is located across the H1 freeway north of Waipahu. Waikele consists of newer subdivisions and an upscale outlet shopping center and world-famous golf course. To the west via either roadway can be reached Makakilo and Kapolei, with the Leeward coast beyond.  To the east lie Pearl City and the H-2 interchange to Waipio.  At the western end of Waipahu is Kunia Road (State Rte. 750) which leads to the Waipahu newer growth areas of Royal Kunia and Village Park north of H-1, and eventually on up across the central plain to Kunia and Schofield Barracks, Wheeler Army Airfield, and Wahiawā. Kunia Road becomes Fort Weaver Road (State Rte. 76) south of Farrington Highway, and goes south through Honouliuli and Ewa Villages to Ewa Beach.

Demographics

As of the census of 2000, there were 33,108 people, 7,566 households, and 6,431 families residing in the CDP. The racial makeup of the CDP was 4.73% White, 0.93% African American, 0.14% Native American, 67.1% Asian (55.5% Filipino), 12.31% Pacific Islander, 0.86% from other races, and 15.26% from two or more races. Hispanic or Latino of any race were 6.09% of the population.

There were 7,566 households, out of which 36.2% had children under the age of 18 living with them, 59.8% were married couples living together, 18.1% had a female householder with no husband present, and 15.0% were non-families. 11.1% of all households were made up of individuals, and 6.0% had someone living alone who was 65 years of age or older.  The average household size was 4.23 and the average family size was 4.37.

In the CDP the population was spread out, with 26.4% under the age of 18, 9.5% from 18 to 24, 26.8% from 25 to 44, 21.5% from 45 to 64, and 15.8% who were 65 years of age or older.  The median age was 36 years. For every 100 females there were 97.6 males.  For every 100 females age 18 and over, there were 95.3 males.

The median income for a household in the CDP was $49,444, and the median income for a family was $51,855. Males had a median income of $28,295 versus $23,818 for females. The per capita income for the CDP was $14,484.  About 10.6% of families and 13.8% of the population were below the poverty line, including 17.0% of those under age 18 and 13.9% of those age 65 or over.

The total number of Civilian Veterans in Waipahu is 2,376, or 9.8 percent of the total population (National average is 12.70%).

In 2000, there were 8,230 people in Waipahu listed as disabled.

At the time of the last survey, 14,458 people in Waipahu had a high school diploma, approximately 68.6% of the population (compared to the national average of 80.40%).

2,349 people in Waipahu also had a bachelor's degree or higher, which equates to approximately 11.1% of the total population (National average was 24.40%).

Government and infrastructure

The United States Postal Service operates the Waipahu Post Office in Waipahu.

The Hawaii Department of Public Safety operates the Waiawa Correctional Facility in an area near Waipahu.

Education
The Hawaii Department of Education operates public schools.

Elementary schools in the CDP include August Ahrens, Honowai, and Waipahu. Additionally two other elementary schools are outside of the Waipahu CDP but use Waipahu postal addresses: Kale'iopu'u Elementary School is in Royal Kunia CDP (formerly in Village Park CDP), and Waikele Elementary School is in Waikele CDP.

Waipahu Intermediate School and Waipahu High School are in the CDP.

Waipahu contains two (high) school districts, with some students attending Waipahu High School while others attend Pearl City High School.

Lanakila Baptist School maintains its administrative office and elementary school building in Waipahu.

Hawaii's Plantation Village 
The Hawaii Plantation Village currently serves as an outdoor museum that showcases the lifestyles and experiences of Hawaii's plantation workers.

The museum opened its doors on September 20, 1992, displaying original structures and replica homes of the multiethnic groups who came to Hawaii between the mid-1800s and the 1940s to work as plantation laborers.

Guided tours are conducted at the start of each hour, Monday through Saturday from 10:00 a.m. - 2:00 pm.

Notable residents
 Danny Barcelona, drummer in Louis Armstrong's All-Star Band, born in Waipahu.
 Kirk Caldwell, American politician, Mayor of Honolulu, born in Waipahu
 Timmy Chang, American professional football player for the Arizona Cardinals, Detroit Lions, and Philadelphia Eagles, current NCAA coach, born in Waipahu.
 Brian Viloria, American professional boxer, former WBA and WBO unified flyweight champion, former WBC and IBF light flyweight champion.
 Jerome Williams, American professional baseball pitcher for the Philadelphia Phillies, 1999 graduate of Waipahu High School.
 Victoria Lee, One Championship mixed martial arts.

References

External links

 Hawaii Plantation Village

 
Census-designated places in Honolulu County, Hawaii
Filipino-American culture in Hawaii
Sugar plantations in Hawaii